Kosmos 1792 was a Soviet reconnaissance satellite which was launched in 1986. A Yantar-4K2 satellite, it operated for almost two months before being deorbited and recovered.

Launched at 10:59 UTC on November 13, 1986 using a Soyuz-U rocket flying from the Baikonur Cosmodrome, Kosmos 1792 was operated in low Earth orbit until it was recovered on January 5, 1987. In addition to the main spacecraft, two separable film capsules were also returned during the satellite's mission.

In November 1987, other spacecraft that launched that month besides Kosmos 1792 included Kosmos 1790, Kosmos 1791, Molinya 1-68, Gorizont No.22L, Kosmos 1793, eight Strela-1M satellites  designated Kosmos 1794 to 1801, Kosmos 1802 and Mech-K No.303 - which failed to achieve orbit.

See also

1986 in spaceflight
List of Kosmos satellites (1751–2000)
Yantar (satellite)

References

External links
Gunter's Yantar-4K2

Spacecraft launched in 1986
Kosmos satellites
Spacecraft which reentered in 1987
Yantar (satellite)